Baghiata is a settlement in the Dzau District/Java Municipality of South Ossetia, Shida Kartli, Georgia.

See also
 Dzau District

Notes

References  

Populated places in Dzau District